Førde may refer to:

Places
Førde (town), a town in Sunnfjord municipality in Vestland county, Norway
Førde, a former municipality in the old Sogn og Fjordane county, Norway
Førde Airport, Bringeland, an airport serving the town of Førde in Vestland county, Norway
Førde Church, a church in Sunnfjord municipality in Vestland county, Norway
Førde Fjord (or Førdefjorden), a fjord in the Sunnfjord region in Vestland county, Norway
Førde, Hordaland, a village in Sveio municipality in Vestland county, Norway
Førre (sometimes spelled Førde), a village in Tysvær municipality in Rogaland county, Norway
Fyrde (sometimes spelled Førde), a village in Volda municipality in Møre og Romsdal county, Norway

People
Einar Førde, a Norwegian politician and a director-general of the Norwegian Broadcasting Corporation

Other
Førde Health Trust, a public hospital trust that operates hospitals in Vestland county, Norway

See also
Forde (disambiguation)